The 1969 NBA playoffs was the postseason tournament of the National Basketball Association's 1968–69 season. The tournament concluded with the Eastern Division champion Boston Celtics defeating the Western Division champion Los Angeles Lakers 4 games to 3 in the NBA Finals.

Despite finishing in 4th place, the Celtics won their second straight NBA title, marking their 11th overall as their era of 1960s dominance drew to a close. They upset Philadelphia and New York on the way to the Finals. Out west, the San Francisco Warriors stunned the Lakers by winning the first 2 in L.A., and Bay Area fans were thinking of avenging the prior year's sweep by the Lakers with a sweep of their own. But the Lakers won 4 straight to win the series in 6.

This year marked the debut of the NBA Finals Most Valuable Player Award; it was awarded to Jerry West of the Lakers, which marks the only time so far that the trophy has been given to a player on the losing team.

The Celtics were the first team seeded below third in their conference or division and win the NBA championship.  It would not happen again until the 1995 NBA playoffs.

The second-year San Diego Rockets made their first playoff appearance; the next time they appeared was in 1975 as the Houston Rockets.

Bracket

Division Semifinals

Eastern Division Semifinals

(1) Baltimore Bullets vs. (3) New York Knicks

This was the first playoff meeting between these two teams.

(2) Philadelphia 76ers vs. (4) Boston Celtics

This was the 13th playoff meeting between these two teams, with the Celtics winning seven of the first 12 meetings.

Western Division Semifinals

(1) Los Angeles Lakers vs. (3) San Francisco Warriors

 The Lakers become the first team to win a playoff series after losing the first 2 games at home.

This was the third playoff meeting between these two teams, with both teams splitting the first two meetings.

(2) Atlanta Hawks vs. (4) San Diego Rockets

This was the first playoff meeting between these two teams.

Division Finals

Eastern Division Finals

(3) New York Knicks vs. (4) Boston Celtics

 John Havlicek hits the series-winning shot.

This was the seventh playoff meeting between these two teams, with both teams splitting the first six meetings.

Western Division Finals

(1) Los Angeles Lakers vs. (2) Atlanta Hawks

This was the ninth playoff meeting between these two teams, with the Hawks winning five of the first eight meetings while in St. Louis.

NBA Finals: (W1) Los Angeles Lakers vs. (E4) Boston Celtics

 Sam Jones hits the game-winner at the buzzer.

 Don Nelson hit a foul-line jumper which dropped through the basket after hitting the back rim and bouncing several feet straight up. The shot gave the Celtics a 105–102 lead after the Lakers cut their lead to 103–102.
 Bill Russell and Sam Jones’ final NBA game; Celtics become the first team to come back from a 2–0 series deficit in the NBA Finals.

This was the seventh playoff meeting between these two teams, with the Celtics winning the first six meetings.

See also
1969 NBA Finals
1969 NBA season

References

External links 
 Basketball-Reference.com's 1969 NBA Playoffs page

National Basketball Association playoffs
Playoffs

fi:NBA-kausi 1968–1969#Pudotuspelit